WNBZ-FM (106.3 MHz) is a radio station broadcasting a classic hits format. Licensed to Saranac, New York, United States, the station is owned by Amanda Dagley and William Dickerson, through NBZ, LLC. Its studios are located on City Hall Place in Plattsburgh, New York, in a storefront adjacent to the McDonough Monument. The studios were formerly located in the Gateway office building, also in Plattsburgh; it has previously maintained facilities at Radio Park in Saranac Lake and in the Champlain Centre mall in Plattsburgh.

, WNBZ-FM's programming was simulcast on WRGR (102.1 FM) in Tupper Lake; it has also simulcast with WNBZ (1240 AM) in Saranac Lake and WLPW (105.5 FM) in Lake Placid. , WNBZ-FM was the only one of Saranac Lake Radio's stations to remain on the air. That month, Saranac Lake Radio agreed to sell the station to NBZ, LLC for $300,000; under the terms of the deal, the new owners began programming WNBZ-FM under a local marketing agreement on December 1. The sale was consummated on August 6, 2018.

Previous logo

References

External links

NBZ-FM
Classic hits radio stations in the United States
Radio stations established in 1989
1989 establishments in New York (state)